Deep Throat, Deep-throat or Deepthroat may refer to:

Arts and entertainment
 Deep Throat (film), a 1972 pornographic film
 Deep Throat (The X-Files), a character in The X-Files
 "Deep Throat", a 1993 episode of The X-Files
 Deep Throat (album), a 2002 album by Henry Rollins
 "Deep Throats", a 2006 episode of Family Guy
 "Deepthroat" (song), a 2015 song by American rapper Cupcakke from the album Cum Cake 
 Gray Fox (Metal Gear) or Deepthroat, a character in Metal Gear Solid

Other uses
 Deep-throating, a type of fellatio
 Deep Throat (Watergate), the anonymous source (later revealed to be Mark Felt) in The Washington Post investigation of U.S. President Nixon's 1972 Watergate scandal
 The Deep Throat Sex Scandal, 2010 American play
 DeepThroat, the algorithm used by 15.ai to facilitate the cloning of voices with minimal viable data